Kiorr (Kha Kior) is a Palaungic language of Luang Namtha Province, Laos.

Diffloth & Zide (1992) had listed Con as a Lametic language.  However, it is treated as a dialect of Kiorr in Sidwell (2010). Kiorr could be a historical name for the Saamtaav people.

References

Palaungic languages
Languages of Laos